Masonville is an unincorporated community and a U.S. Post Office in Larimer County, Colorado, United States.  The Masonville Post Office has the ZIP Code 80541.

Geography
Masonville is located at  (40.487171,-105.210056).

References

Unincorporated communities in Larimer County, Colorado
Unincorporated communities in Colorado